It's No Laughing Matter is an extant 1915 American comedy silent film written and directed by Lois Weber. The film stars Macklyn Arbuckle, Cora Drew, Myrtle Stedman, Charles Marriott, Adele Farrington, and Frank Elliott. The film was released on January 14, 1915, by Paramount Pictures.

Plot

Cast 
Macklyn Arbuckle as Hi Judd
Cora Drew as Mrs. Judd
Myrtle Stedman as Bess Judd
Charles Marriott as Jim Skinner
Adele Farrington as Widow Wilkins
Frank Elliott as Sam

Preservation status
Only a portion of It's No Laughing Matter exists in the Library of Congress. Both the Library of Congress database website and the Catalog of Holdings 1978 book indicate incomplete or fragmentary status.

See also
List of Paramount Pictures films

References

External links 
 
 

1915 films
1910s English-language films
Silent American comedy films
1915 comedy films
Paramount Pictures films
Films directed by Lois Weber
American black-and-white films
American silent feature films
1910s American films